Jacques Allard (8 September 1925 – 15 July 2015) was a French sailor. He competed in the 5.5 Metre event at the 1952 Summer Olympics.

References

External links
 

1925 births
2015 deaths
French male sailors (sport)
Olympic sailors of France
Sailors at the 1952 Summer Olympics – 5.5 Metre
People from Arcachon
Sportspeople from Gironde
20th-century French people